The 4th South Carolina Cavalry Regiment was a regiment of cavalry in the Confederate States Army during the American Civil War.  They were from the state of South Carolina and served primarily in the Eastern Theater of the American Civil War.  The 4th South Carolina Cavalry Regiment was organized on December 16, 1862, by consolidating the 10th Battalion South Carolina Cavalry, the 12th Battalion South Carolina Cavalry, the Charleston Light Dragoons and Company A of the St. James Mounted Riflemen. The 10th Cavalry Battalion (also called the 3rd Battalion) was organized in the spring of 1862 with five companies, and Major James P. Adams and Major William Stokes were the commanding officers. The 12th Cavalry Battalion had also been known as the 4th Cavalry Battalion.

Organization and history
When it was first formed, the 4th South Carolina Cavalry Regiment was commanded by Colonel B. Huger Rutledge and served in the 1st Military District of South Carolina, commanded by Brigadier General Roswell S. Ripley. The 1st Military District was in the Department of South Carolina, Georgia and Florida, under the command of General P. G. T. Beauregard. The 4th SC Cavalry served here from December 1862 until it was transferred to the Army of Northern Virginia in March 1864.

With 1,350 officers and men, the regiment was attached to the brigade known as Butler's Brigade under the command of Brigadier General Matthew Butler, which served under Major General Hampton's Division of cavalry, in the Cavalry Corps, Army of Northern Virginia.

It saw heavy action at the battles of Haw's Shop, Va., Matadequin Creek, Va., and Trevilian Station, Va. Between May 28, 1864, and June 12, 1864, the regiment suffered more than 280 killed, wounded or captured.

In January 1865 the 4th SC Cavalry and all of Hampton's Division were detached from the Army of Northern Virginia and transferred south, by railroad, to the Department of Tennessee and Georgia, commanded by Lieutenant General William J. Hardee, and was under the Cavalry Command of Lieutenant General Hampton. Following the fall of Columbia, South Carolina, the unit, along with the entire Cavalry Command were transferred to the Army of Tennessee under General Joseph E. Johnston, where they fought final actions in the Campaign of the Carolinas through the spring of 1865, surrendering with the Army of the Tennessee with less than 200 men.

Of the seven cavalry regiments raised in South Carolina during the war, the 4th South Carolina lost more men than any other unit. More than 260 members of the 4th South Carolina were killed in action or died of wounds, disease or in federal prisoner of war camps.

CORRECTION TO PRECEDING. Per the book Saddle Soldiers, the Correspondence of General William Stokes (Lt. Colonel of the 4th) by Lloyd Halliburton the 4th SC Cavalry did not surrender. The General's own words were "not desiring to go through the formality of surrendering the Regiment which I commanded, I ordered the camp struck at 8:30 P.M. and marched toward Asheboro, NC. ... At this place I disbanded the Regiment and sent them home." On the morning of 27 April General Stokes awoke to find the teamsters had disappeared with the mule team of the headquarters wagon. He then ordered the wagon burned rather than allow it to fall into enemy hands. With that, most of the records, and history, of the 4th SC Cavalry disappeared.

Officers and units
The commanding and staff officers of the regiment were:
Colonel Benjamin Huger Rutledge
Lieutenant Colonel William Stokes
Major William P. Emanuel
Adjutant James R. Massey; Gabriel Manigault
Chaplain William Banks
Quartermaster Joseph W. McCurry
Surgeon: Isaac M. Gregorie
Assistant Surgeon Capers M. Rivers
Sergeant Major Garland M. Yancey

Most of the companies in this regiment existed previously as South Carolina Militia companies.  Some, such as the Charleston Light Dragoons, traced their history to the early-to-mid 18th century, and are mentioned as guarding Fort Sumter in the summer of 1860.  The companies in the regiment were:
 Company A - Chesterfield District
 Company B - Chester and Fairfield Districts
 Company C - Oconee, Pickens and Anderson Districts
 Company D - Santee Mounted Riflemen - Georgetown District
 Company E - Marlboro District
 Company F - E. M. Dragoons - Marion District
 Company G - Orangeburg and Colleton Districts
 Company H - Catawba Rangers - Lancaster District
 Company I - Williamsburg Light Dragoons - Williamsburg District
 Company K - Charleston Light Dragoons - Charleston and Beaufort Districts

Notable battles
The battle history of the regiment:
 Black River (Aug. 13, 1862)
 Destruction  of the  George Washington near Beaufort, South Carolina (April 9, 1863)
Raid at Combahee Ferry (June 2, 1863)
Expedition from Fort Pulaski, Georgia, to Bluffton, South Carolina (June 4, 1863)
Lownde's Mill, Combahee River (Sept. 13–14, 1863)
Cunningham's Bluff (Nov. 24, 1863)
Battle of Haw's Shop (May 28, 1864)
Battle of Matadequin Creek (June 1–3, 1864)
Battle of Trevilian Station (June 11–12, 1864)
Siege of Petersburg (June 1864 - Jan. 1865)
Battle of Vaughan Road (Oct. 1, 1864)
Battle of Burgess's Mill (Oct. 27–28, 1864)
Carolinas Campaign (Feb.-April 1865)
Battle of Monroe's Crossroads (Mar. 10, 1865)
Battle of Bentonville (Mar. 19–21, 1865)

See also
6th Regiment South Carolina Cavalry
Cheraw, South Carolina#Civil War
South Carolina in the American Civil War
South Carolina Civil War Confederate Units

Notes

References
Bell, Louise, Rebels in Gray, Soldiers from Pickens District 1861-65, (Co. C)
Brooks, U. R., Butler and His Cavalry: 1861-1865
Dietrich, Richard Kevin, To Virginia and Back with Rutledge's Cavalry: A History of the 4th South Carolina Cavalry Regiment, Broadfoot Publishing Company, 2015
Halliburton, Lloyd, Saddle Soldiers: The Civil War Correspondence of William Stokes of the 4th South Carolina Cavalry
Martin, Samuel, Matthew Calbraith Butler: Confederate General, Hampton Red Shirt, and U.S. Senator
Rigdon, John C., Historical Sketch and Roster of the SC 4th Cavalry Regiment
Rivers, Colonel William J., Rivers Account of the Raising of the Troops for State and Confederate Service, Columbia, The Bryan Printing Co., 1909, Reprint 1998 by Eastern Digital Resources.
Salley, A. S., South Carolina Troops in Confederate Service, Volume II, Historical Commission of South Carolina, The State Co., 1930.
Smith, D. H., The Call To Arms, Williamsburg, Rosters
Wellman, Manley, Giant in Grey
Wells, Edward L., Hampton and His Cavalry in '64
Wells, Edward L., A Sketch of the Charleston Light Dragoons From the Earliest Formation of the Corps, 1888, Reprint 1997.

Units and formations of the Confederate States Army from South Carolina
1862 establishments in South Carolina
Military units and formations established in 1862